Harry Leo Schein  (13 October 1924 – 11 February 2006) was an Austrian-born Swedish chemical engineer, writer and a major figure in Swedish culture. Born in Vienna, Schein was a founder of the Swedish Film Institute and acted as its first Managing Director from 1963 to 1978.

He is best known for his role in pushing through the film reform of 1963, which ensured that 10 percent of the money from cinema ticket sales was handed to a central film organization. This system guaranteed continuous production of Swedish films for several decades. After the film reform, there was a golden age for Swedish film with Ingmar Bergman, Bo Widerberg and Jan Troell as leading names.

Schein was often engaged in public debates and demonstrated a distinctive understanding of the use of media.

Schein was also a columnist in Dagens Nyheter for more than 20 years, and wrote several books on current issues. He also published several largely autobiographical books, including Schein (1980) and Sluten (1995). At the 7th Guldbagge Awards he won a Special Achievement award.

Schein was married to the Swedish actress Ingrid Thulin from 1956 to 1989 and was a close friend of Olof Palme. He died in 2006 in Danderyd.

References

Notes
Lars Ilshammar, Pelle Snickars and Per Vesterlund: Citizen Schein, 2010.

External links
The Swedish Film Database
The Ingmar Bergman Foundation

1924 births
2006 deaths
20th-century Swedish writers
Jewish Austrian writers
Swedish essayists
Swedish male writers
Austrian essayists
Austrian columnists
Swedish columnists
Austrian emigrants to Sweden
Male essayists
20th-century essayists
Jewish emigrants from Nazi Germany to Sweden